Temple Ohev Sholom, established in 1853, is the oldest Jewish synagogue in Harrisburg, Pennsylvania, United States and its surrounding area. It was established as an Orthodox congregation. In 1867, it became a Reform congregation.

Rabbis
Rabbi Marc Kline is the current rabbi of Ohev Sholom, becoming the interim rabbi in 2022. He succeeded Rabbi Peter Kesler.

References

Religious buildings and structures in Harrisburg, Pennsylvania
Jews and Judaism in Harrisburg, Pennsylvania
Religious organizations established in 1853
Reform synagogues in Pennsylvania
1853 establishments in Pennsylvania